Alexander Lennart Steen (born 1 March 1984) is a Canadian-born Swedish former professional ice hockey player. Steen was drafted 24th overall by the Toronto Maple Leafs in the 2002 NHL Entry Draft, and started his NHL career with Toronto. Steen was traded to the St. Louis Blues in 2008, where he played the remainder of his career. Steen won the Stanley Cup with the Blues in 2019.

Steen is the son of Thomas Steen, who also played professional ice hockey and later became a conservative politician.

Playing career

Elitserien (2001–2005)
Steen played for Frölunda HC from 1999 to 2004. He spent the 2004–05 season with Modo Hockey after a highly controversial signing.

Toronto Maple Leafs (2005–2008)
In the 2002 NHL Entry Draft, Steen was selected in the first round by the Toronto Maple Leafs, 24th overall. He played his first game with the Leafs on 5 October 2005 during the season opener against the rival Ottawa Senators, and registered a minor penalty. His first career NHL goal came in the next game on 8 October against the Montreal Canadiens. This goal marked the first time a Swedish father (former Winnipeg Jets player Thomas Steen) and son both scored in the NHL (beating Robert Nilsson, son of Kent Nilsson, by 21 days).
Steen scored his first career hat-trick on 4 January 2007 against the Boston Bruins, ending with a five-point game night.

St. Louis Blues (2008–2020)
On 24 November 2008, Steen was traded by the Leafs, along with Carlo Colaiacovo, to the St. Louis Blues for Lee Stempniak.

On 1 July 2010, Steen signed a four-year contract extension with the Blues. He had an NHL career-high 51 points in the 2011–12 season.

On 25 September 2012, Steen returned to Modo Hockey on a short-term contract during the 2012–13 NHL lockout.

He was named the NHL First Star of the Month for October 2013, with his 11 goals leading the league, and 16 points, fourth-best. With a goal and an assist against the Carolina Hurricanes on November 16th, Steen extended his point streak to 13 consecutive games, the best such streak by a Blues player since Pierre Turgeon in 1999–2000.

Steen signed a three-year, $17.4 million contract with the Blues on 18 December 2013.

On 4 April 2014, he was nominated by the St. Louis chapter of the Professional Hockey Writers' Association for the Bill Masterton Memorial Trophy. The trophy is awarded annually to the player "who best exemplifies the qualities of perseverance, sportsmanship and dedication to hockey." Steen lead the Blues with 33 goals, and lead them in the points department as well with 62 points despite losing 11 games from a concussion in December 2013.

On 23 September 2016, he signed a four-year, $23 million contract extension with the Blues.

Steen won the 2019 Stanley Cup Finals with the Blues, St. Louis' first Stanley Cup in their 52-year franchise history.

Retirement
On 17 December 2020, Steen announced his retirement from hockey due to back injury. Steen finished his career fourth in games played, sixth in assists, and fifth in points in Blues franchise history. Additionally, he and his father are one of just four father-son duos to each obtain 600 points in the NHL.

Personal life
Alexander Steen's father is former Winnipeg Jets star Thomas Steen, a forward who scored 817 points in 950 NHL games between 1981 and 1995. Although Steen was born in Winnipeg during his father's tenure with the Jets, he has dual Canadian and Swedish citizenship; he has chosen to represent Sweden in international hockey competition. Alexander has two surviving siblings — his youngest brother Amadeus died at the age of two months of a heart condition. His death was the motivation for Alex, along with family members, to create the Amadeus Steen Foundation to raise funds for, and offer support to, infant and child health care.

Career statistics

Regular season and playoffs

International

Awards and honours

See also
List of family relations in the NHL

References

External links
 

1984 births
Canadian expatriate ice hockey players in Sweden
Canadian ice hockey centres
Canadian people of Swedish descent
Frölunda HC players
Ice hockey players at the 2014 Winter Olympics
Living people
Medalists at the 2014 Winter Olympics
Modo Hockey players
National Hockey League first-round draft picks
Olympic ice hockey players of Sweden
Olympic medalists in ice hockey
Olympic silver medalists for Sweden
St. Louis Blues players
Ice hockey people from Winnipeg
Stanley Cup champions
Swedish expatriate ice hockey players in the United States
Swedish ice hockey players
Swedish people of Canadian descent
Toronto Maple Leafs draft picks
Toronto Maple Leafs players